Mal-1 is the debut album by American jazz pianist Mal Waldron. It was recorded in November 1956 and released on the Prestige label in May 1957.

Reception
A contemporaneous review by John S. Wilson stated that trumpeter Idrees Sulieman and alto saxophonist Gigi Gryce "play unusually well while Waldron contributes several provocative compositions and arrangements (especially a version of Yesterdays that is a remarkably interesting rewriting of a real warhorse) and plays with typically dark, warm charm". The Allmusic review by Jim Todd awarded the album 4 stars, stating "Mal Waldron's recording debut as a leader presents the pianist with his many gifts already well developed".

Track listing
 "Stablemates" (Benny Golson) – 4:51
 "Yesterdays" (Otto Harbach, Jerome Kern) – 7:47
 "Transfiguration" (Lee Sears) – 7:17
 "Bud Study" – 5:48 (Mal Waldron)
 "Dee's Dilemma" – 6:58 (Mal Waldron)
 "Shome" (Idrees Sulieman) – 5:07
Recorded at Rudy Van Gelder Studio in Hackensack, New Jersey on November 9, 1956.

Personnel
Mal Waldron – piano
Idrees Sulieman – trumpet
Gigi Gryce – alto saxophone
Julian Euell – bass
Arthur Edgehill – drums

References

Prestige Records albums
Mal Waldron albums
1957 albums
Albums produced by Bob Weinstock
Albums recorded at Van Gelder Studio